Sir Theophilus Cooper (15 November 1850 – 18 May 1925) was a New Zealand compositor, lawyer and judge. He was born in Newington, Surrey, England, on 15 November 1850. Cooper was conferred a knighthood in the 1921 New Year Honours.

References

1850 births
1925 deaths
19th-century New Zealand judges
District Court of New Zealand judges
English emigrants to New Zealand
People from Surrey (before 1889)
New Zealand Knights Bachelor
People from Newington, London